I Am the Rain is the eighth studio album released by singer-songwriter Chely Wright. The album was released via MRI/Sony/Painted Red Records on September 9, 2016 after being funded by fans through a Kickstarter campaign which was launched in September 2014.

I Am the Rain is Wright's second highest debuting album of her career on the Billboard Country Chart at No. 13 and her highest charting album of her career on the Top Album Sales Chart at No. 54.

Background 
After a highly successful Kickstarter campaign, funded by over 2,000 backers, Wright's album campaign became the most successful Kickstarter campaign of any country artist. The album's recording process began in September 2015. The album, unlike any previous of Wright's was recorded almost entirely in California and was her first new material since coming out as a lesbian in May 2010. Beginning on September 8, 2015 and concluding on September 12, 2015, the album was recorded mainly at Sunset Sound in Los Angeles, California with additional recording done in Culver City and Nashville, Tennessee.

In an update to Kickstarter supporters on April 19, 2016, Wright revealed that Grammy award-winning producer, Joe Henry was the producer for the record, a suggestion given to her by close friend Rodney Crowell. She also confirmed the album's release and distribution through SonyRed.

In addition to Henry at the helm of production, singer songwriters, Rodney Crowell, Emmylou Harris, and The Milk Carton Kids served as guest vocalists on the album. Crowell provided background vocals on "Holy War," while Harris appears on, "Pain." The Milk Carton Kids make two appearances on the album during, "You Are the River," and the Bob Dylan cover, "Tomorrow Is A Long Time."

"What About Your Heart" was made available as an instant download track for all pre-orders while fans who pre-ordered the album through Wright's website received "Mexico" as an instant download track.

Commercial reception
The album debuted at No. 13 on Billboard's Top Country Albums chart, selling 4,100 copies in the first week. It also reached No. 181 on Billboard 200.  It also mark's her first appearance on the Billboard Folk/Americana Chart debuting in the top 10 at No. 9.

Track listing 
 "Inside" (Chely Wright) - 4:18
 "Where Will You Be" (Wright) - 4:14
 "At The Heart Of Me" (Rodney Crowell, Joe Henry, Wright) - 4:45
 "You Are The River" (Edie Carey, Wright) - 5:01
 "Holy War" (Henry, Wright) - 4:52
 "What About Your Heart" (Wright) - 3:59
 "Pain" (Wright) - 3:58
 "Tomorrow Is a Long Time" (Bob Dylan) - 3:35
 "Blood And Bones And Skin" (Wright) - 3:59
 "Mexico" (Wright) - 4:41
 "Next To Me" (Wright) - 3:52
 "Halona" (Wright) - 4:12
 "See Me Home" (Henry, Wright) - 5:18

Personnel 
Per album liner notes: 
 Joe Henry - Producer
 Ryan Freeland - Recording and Mixing 
 Drew Bollman - Recording and Mixing
 Reed Black - Engineer
 Clinton Welander - Assistant Engineer
 Mike Stankiewicz - Assistant Engineer
 Kim Rosen - Mastering
 Jay Bellerose - Drums, Percussion 
 Mark Goldenberg - Acoustic Guitar, Electric Guitar
 Levon Henry - Clarinet, Bass Clarinet, Tenor Saxophone
 Eric Haywood - Pedal Steel
 Adam Levy - Acoustic Guitar, Electric Guitar
 David Piltch - Upright Bass, Electric Bass
 Patrick Warren - Piano, Pump and Hammond organ, additional keys 
 Jedd Hughes - Electric Guitar 
 Jeremy Lister - background vocals 
 Rodney Crowell - background vocals 
 Emmylou Harris - background vocals
 Joey Ryan - background vocals
 Kenneth Pattengale - background vocals
 Katherine H. Almedia - background vocals
 Karen M. Bosia - background vocals
 Althea Champagnie - background vocals 
 Kate Cotter-Reilly - background vocals
 Jeff Parshley - background vocals
 Marla Pasquale - background vocals
 Tamara Lynn Peterson - background vocals
 Julie Shiflett - background vocals

Charts

Release History

References 

2016 albums
Chely Wright albums